The 1894 San Juan earthquake took place in the province of San Juan, Argentina, on 27 October 1894, at about 07:30 PM. It was the most powerful earthquake recorded in Argentina, with magnitude 7.5 on the surface wave magnitude scale.

The maximum perceived intensity for the earthquake was IX (Violent) on the Mercalli intensity scale. It caused severe damage and about 100 casualties in San Juan and the province of La Rioja, and also caused minor damage in Catamarca, Córdoba, San Luis and Mendoza, up to 500 km away from the epicenter.

See also
 List of earthquakes in Argentina
 List of historical earthquakes

References

  Instituto Nacional de Prevención Sísmica. Listado de Terremotos Históricos .

Further reading

1894
1894 in Argentina
Earthquakes in San Juan Province, Argentina
San Juan, 1894
October 1894 events
1894 disasters in Argentina